This is a list of Olympic medalists in sailing.

Olympic medalist by discipline 
 List of Olympic medalists in sailing by discipline

Olympic medalist by class  
 List of Olympic medalists in sailing by class

Notes

References
 

Sailing
Medalists

Olympic medalists